The Transglobal Secure Collaboration Participation, Inc. (TSCP), which sponsors the Transglobal Secure Collaboration Program, was established
in 2002 as a collaborative forum of organizations in the defense industry to address security issues with collaboration. TSCP is
a government and industry partnership for secure electronic transmission and sharing of sensitive information internationally.

Description
The group was originally called the Transatlantic Secure Collaboration Project, based in the USA and the UK.
The first phase of a framework was published by US and UK contractors by March 5, 2003.
For TSCP members (which include government departments and agencies, as well as system integrators and defense manufacturers) this framework enables secure access to other members’ sensitive data by creating a collaborative environment based on trust mechanisms. 
TSCP’s chain of trust includes government entities and their prime contractors, as well as suppliers. Its focus expanded from secure data access to data-centric information protection, particularly as a defense against cyber threats.
It is based in Vienna, Virginia, USA.

Members

Government 
United States Department of Defense
United States General Services Administration
United States Secret Service
NASA - National Aeronautics and Space Administration
ANSSI - Agence nationale de la sécurité des systèmes d’information (French Agency for National Security of Information Systems)
Ministry of Defence (Netherlands)
Ministry of Defence (United Kingdom)

Industry

BAE Systems
The Boeing Company
EADS
Lockheed Martin
Northrop Grumman
Raytheon
CA Technologies
Microsoft
Axiomatics
Boldon James
Deep-Secure
Deloitte & Touche LLP
Electrosoft
Fugen Solutions
Gemalto
HID Global (formerly ActivIdentity)
ID DataWeb
Intercede
Litmus Logic
National Aerospace Laboratory (NLR)
NextLabs
Ping Identity
Syneren Technologies Corporation
Wave Systems Corporation
Chevron Corporation

See also
Netherlands Atlantic Association

References

Globalization
Organizations established in 2002